HIT is a Spanish high school-themed drama television series created by Joaquín Oristrell that began airing on 21 September 2020. Produced by RTVE in collaboration with Grupo Ganga and starring Daniel Grao as Hugo Ibarra Toledo, an unconventional educator, the series is focused on problems in high school, such as violence, harassment, and bullying.

Premise 
It is set in a fictional high school in Madrid. Coexistence at the Instituto Anna Frank has become untenable. If the high school is to remain open, a way out of the news events pages needs to be found. Ester, the director of the centre, seeks help from Hugo Ibarra Toledo (HIT), an unconventional educator.

The second season moves to the IES León Felipe, in Puertollano, where Ibarra tries to help a group of 9 vocational training students. Upon Ibarra's eventual relapse into alcoholism, he meets up again with Lena (an alumn from the Anna Frank) in a rehab centre.

Cast 
Introduced in season 1

Introduced in season 2

Introduced in season 3

Production and release 
Created by Joaquín Oristrell, the latter co-directed the series together with Álvaro Fernández Armero and Elena Trapé.
Shooting started by January 2020, taking place in Madrid. Following a hiatus caused by the COVID-19 lockdown, it resumed on 22 June 2020 and it wrapped on 24 July 2020. The release date of the series was also delayed due to the COVID-19 pandemic. The first episode was pre-screened at the 23rd Málaga Film Festival on 27 August 2020.

The first episode premiered on 21 September 2020, commanding a 10% share of the audience, and remained roughly stable for the rest of the series (10 episodes), with a 9.2% average. Following the good audience results (the most watched Spanish free-to-air fiction series in the season) and a good critical reception, the renovation of the series for a second season was announced in November 2020.

Filming of season 2 started in May 2021 in Mejorada del Campo. Season 2 (consisting also of 10 episodes) brought a wholly new fictional setting in Puertollano and a revamped cast, with three actors returning: Daniel Grao, Rebeca Sala and Luisa Vides. The writing team, led by Oristrell, also featured Yolanda García Serrano, Jacobo Delgado, Luis Caballero and Pablo Bartolomé. Directors of season 2 include Elena Trapé and Polo Menarguez. The first episode of season 2 was pre-screened on 9 September 2021 at Cine Callao in Madrid. The trailer for season 2 was released afterwards. The series' first season began airing on RTL Deutschland's TVNOW on 15 September 2021. On 14 October 2021, RTVE disclosed the 21 October 2021 premiere date, later revealing a pre-screening on RTVE Play predating by some hours the linear broadcasting on La 1.

On 20 April 2022, RTVE announced the renovation of the series for a third season, to be shot in La Palma.

Episodes

Season 1

Season 2

Viewership figures

Awards and nominations 

|-
| rowspan = 2 align = "center" | 2021
| rowspan = 2 | 8th 
| colspan = 2 | Best Drama Series
| 
| rowspan = "2" | 
|-
| Best Drama Actor
| Daniel Grao
| 
|-
| align = "center" | 2022 || 30th Actors and Actresses Union Awards || Best Television Actress in a Minor Role || Rebeca Sala ||  || 
|}

References

External links 
 HIT on RTVE Play

La 1 (Spanish TV channel) network series
2020s Spanish drama television series
Spanish-language television shows
2020 Spanish television series debuts
Television series about educators
Television shows filmed in Spain
Television shows set in Madrid
Television shows set in Castilla–La Mancha
2020s teen drama television series
Spanish teen drama television series
Television series by Grupo Ganga
RTVE Play original programming
Television series about bullying